Chanchai Phairatkun (5 April 1929 – 6 June 2022) was a Thai politician.

He died on 6 June 2022 at the age of 93.

References

1929 births
2022 deaths
Chanchai Phairatkun
Chanchai Phairatkun
Chanchai Phairatkun